Melanie Buddemeyer (born c. 1966) is an American former competition swimmer who won a bronze medal in the 100-meter butterfly event at the 1982 World Aquatics Championships in Guayaquil, Ecuador.

In 1983, she received the Dial Award, which is given to an outstanding female American high-school athlete/scholar of the year.  She graduated from the Penn Hills High School in Penn Hills, Pennsylvania (class of 1984) and then from the University of North Carolina (1985–1989).  She also won medals in her signature 100-meter butterfly at the 1985 Pan Pacific Swimming Championships and 1985 World University Games.

previously Married to Mike Kozlina and Mother of Alexa (Ali) Kozlina and Michael (Shane) Kozlina jr.

References

1966 births
Living people
American female butterfly swimmers
North Carolina Tar Heels women's swimmers
People from Allegheny County, Pennsylvania
World Aquatics Championships medalists in swimming
Universiade medalists in swimming
Universiade silver medalists for the United States
Medalists at the 1985 Summer Universiade